Midway Atoll (colloquial: Midway Islands;) is a  atoll in the North Pacific Ocean. Midway Atoll is an insular area of the United States and is an unorganized and unincorporated territory. The largest island is Sand Island, which has housing and an airstrip. Immediately to the east of Sand Island across the narrow Brooks Channel is Eastern Island, which is uninhabited and no longer has any facilities. Forming a rough, incomplete circle around the two main islands and creating Midway Lagoon is Spit Island, a narrow reef.

Roughly equidistant between North America and Asia, Midway is the only island in the Hawaiian Archipelago that is not part of the state of Hawaii. Unlike the other Hawaiian islands, Midway observes Samoa Time (UTC−11:00, i.e., eleven hours behind Coordinated Universal Time), which is one hour behind the time in the Hawaii–Aleutian Time Zone used in Hawaii. For statistical purposes, Midway is grouped as one of the United States Minor Outlying Islands. The Midway Atoll National Wildlife Refuge, encompassing  of land and water in the surrounding area, is administered by the United States Fish and Wildlife Service (FWS). The refuge and most of its surrounding area are part of the larger Papahānaumokuākea Marine National Monument.

From 1941 until 1993, the atoll was the home of Naval Air Facility Midway Island, which played a crucial role in the Battle of Midway, June 4–6, 1942. Aircraft based at the then-named Henderson Field on Eastern Island joined with United States Navy ships and planes in an attack on a Japanese battle group that sank four carriers and one heavy cruiser and defended the atoll from invasion. The battle was a critical Allied victory and a major turning point of the Pacific campaign of World War II.

About 40 people live on the atoll, mostly staff of the U.S. Fish and Wildlife Service and contract workers. Visitation to the atoll is possible only for business reasons, which includes permanent and temporary staff, contractors, and volunteers, as the tourism program has been suspended due to budget cutbacks. In 2012, the last year that the visitor program was in operation, 332 people made the trip to Midway. Tours focused on both the unique ecology of Midway, as well as its military history. The economy is derived solely from governmental sources and tourist fees. Nearly all supplies must be brought to the island by ship or plane, although a hydroponic greenhouse and garden supply some fresh fruits and vegetables.

Location
As its name suggests, Midway is roughly equidistant between North America and Asia, and lies almost halfway around the world longitudinally from Greenwich, England. Unlike the rest of the Northwestern Hawaiian Islands, Midway is not part of the State of Hawaii due to the Hawaiian Organic Act of 1900 that formally annexed Hawaii to the United States as a territory, which defined Hawaii as "the islands acquired by the United States of America under an Act of Congress entitled 'Joint resolution to provide for annexing the Hawaiian Islands to the United States,'" referring to the Newlands Resolution of 1898. While it could be argued that Midway became part of Hawaii when Captain N.C. Brooks of the sealing ship Gambia sighted it in 1859, it was assumed at the time that Midway was independently acquired by the United States when Captain William Reynolds of  visited in 1867, and thus not part of the Hawaii Territory.

In defining which islands the State of Hawaii would inherit from the Territory, the Hawaii Admission Act of 1959 clarified the question, specifically excluding Midway (along with Palmyra Island, Johnston Island, and Kingman Reef) from the jurisdiction of the state.

Geography and geology

Midway Atoll is part of a chain of volcanic islands, atolls, and seamounts extending from the Island of Hawaii up to the tip of the Aleutian Islands and known as the Hawaiian–Emperor seamount chain, between Pearl and Hermes Atoll and Kure Atoll in the Northwestern Hawaiian Islands. The two significant pieces of land, Sand Island and Eastern Island, provide a habitat for millions of seabirds. The island sizes are shown in the table above. The atoll, which has a small population (approximately 60 in 2014, but no indigenous inhabitants), is designated an insular area under the authority of the United States Department of the Interior.

Midway was formed roughly 28 million years ago when the seabed underneath it was over the same hotspot from which the Island of Hawaii is now being formed. In fact, Midway was once a shield volcano, perhaps as large as the island of Lānaʻi. As the volcano piled up lava flows building the island, its weight depressed the crust and the island slowly subsided over a period of millions of years, a process known as isostatic adjustment.

As the island subsided, a coral reef around the former volcanic island was able to maintain itself near sea level by growing upwards. Following Kure Atoll, Midway is the 2nd most northerly atoll in the world.

Infrastructure
Although the FWS closed all airport operations on November22, 2004, public access to the island was restored from March 2008.

Eastern Island Airstrip is a disused airfield that was in use by U.S. forces during the Battle of Midway. It is mostly constructed of Marston Mat and was built by the United States Navy Seabees.

Climate
Despite being located at 28°12′N, which is north of the Tropic of Cancer, Midway Atoll has a tropical savanna climate (Köppen As) with very pleasant year-round temperatures. Rainfall is evenly distributed throughout the year, with only two months being able to be classified as dry season months (May and June).

History

Midway has no indigenous inhabitants and was uninhabited until the 19th century.

19th century
The atoll was sighted on July 5, 1859, by Captain N.C. Brooks, of the sealing ship Gambia. The islands were named the "Middlebrook Islands". Brooks claimed Midway for the United States under the Guano Islands Act of 1856, which authorized Americans to occupy uninhabited islands temporarily to obtain guano. There is no record of any attempt to mine guano on the island. On August28, 1867, Captain William Reynolds of  formally took possession of the atoll for the United States; the name changed to "Midway" some time after this. The atoll was the first Pacific island annexed by the United States, as the Unincorporated Territory of Midway Island, and was administered by the United States Navy.

The first attempt at settlement was in 1870, when the Pacific Mail Steamship Company started a project of blasting and dredging a ship channel through the reef to the lagoon using money put up by the United States Congress. The purpose was to establish a mid-ocean coaling station to avoid the high taxes imposed at ports controlled by the Kingdom of Hawai'i. The project was a failure, and the  evacuated the channel project's work force in October 1870. The ship ran aground on 21 October at Kure Atoll, stranding 93 men. On 18 November, five men set out in a small boat to seek help. On 19 December, four of the men perished when the boat was upset in the breakers off of Kauai. The survivor reached the U.S. Consulate in Honolulu on Christmas Eve. Relief ships were despatched and reached Kure Atoll on 4 January 1871. The survivors of the Saginaw wreck reached Honolulu on 14 January 1871.

Early 20th century

In 1903, workers for the Commercial Pacific Cable Company took up residence on the island as part of the effort to lay a trans-Pacific telegraph cable. These workers introduced many non-native species to the island, including the canary, cycad, Norfolk Island pine, she-oak, coconut, and various deciduous trees; along with ants, cockroaches, termites, centipedes, and countless others.

On January 20, 1903, the United States Navy opened a radio station in response to complaints from cable company workers about Japanese squatters and poachers. Between 1904 and 1908, President Theodore Roosevelt stationed 21 Marines on the island to end wanton destruction of bird life and keep Midway safe as a U.S. possession, protecting the cable station.

In 1935, operations began for the Martin M-130 flying boats operated by Pan American Airlines. The M-130s island-hopped from San Francisco to the Republic of China, providing the fastest and most luxurious route to the Far East and bringing tourists to Midway until 1941. Only the very wealthy could afford the trip, which in the 1930s cost more than three times the annual salary of an average American. With Midway on the route between Honolulu and Wake Island, the flying boats landed in the atoll and pulled up to a float offshore in the lagoon. Tourists transferred to the Pan Am Hotel or the "Gooneyville Lodge", named after the ubiquitous "Gooney birds" (albatrosses).

World War II

The location of Midway in the Pacific became important militarily. Midway was a convenient refueling stop on transpacific flights, and was also an important stop for Navy ships. Beginning in 1940, as tensions with the Japanese rose, Midway was deemed second only to Pearl Harbor in importance to the protection of the U.S. West Coast. Airstrips, gun emplacements and a seaplane base quickly materialized on the tiny atoll.

The channel was widened, and Naval Air Station Midway was completed. Midway was also an important submarine base.

On February 14, 1941, President Franklin Roosevelt issued Executive Order 8682 to create naval defense areas in the central Pacific territories. The proclamation established "Midway Island Naval Defensive Sea Area", which encompassed the territorial waters between the extreme high-water marks and the  marine boundaries surrounding Midway. "Midway Island Naval Airspace Reservation" was also established to restrict access to the airspace over the naval defense sea area. Only U.S. government ships and aircraft were permitted to enter the naval defense areas at Midway Atoll unless authorized by the Secretary of the Navy.

Midway's importance to the U.S. was brought into focus on December7, 1941, when the Japanese attacked Pearl Harbor. Midway was attacked by two destroyers on the same day, and the Japanese force was successfully repulsed in the first American victory of the war. A Japanese submarine bombarded Midway on February10, 1942.

Four months later, on June 4, 1942, a major naval battle near Midway resulted in the U.S. Navy inflicting a devastating defeat on the Imperial Japanese Navy. The U.S. lost the aircraft carrier , along with a number of its carrier- and land-based aircraft that were either shot down by Japanese forces or bombed on the ground at the airfields. The Battle of Midway was, by most accounts, the beginning of the end of the Imperial Japanese Navy's control of the Pacific Ocean.

Starting in July 1942, a submarine tender was always stationed at the atoll to support submarines patrolling Japanese waters. In 1944, a floating dry dock joined the tender.
After the Battle of Midway, a second airfield was developed, this one on Sand Island. This work necessitated enlarging the size of the island through land fill techniques, that when concluded, more than doubled the size of the island.

Korean and Vietnam Wars
From August 1, 1941, to 1945, it was occupied by U.S. military forces. In 1950, the Navy decommissioned Naval Air Station Midway, only to re-commission it again to support the Korean War. Thousands of troops on ships and aircraft stopped at Midway for refueling and emergency repairs. From 1968 to September10, 1993, Midway Island was a Naval Air Facility.

With about 3,500 people living on Sand Island, Midway also supported the U.S. troops during the Vietnam War. In June 1969, President Richard Nixon held a secret meeting with South Vietnamese President Nguyen Van Thieu at the Officer-in-Charge house or "Midway House".

Amateur Radio

Because of it's particularly remote location and political status as a U. S. Navy base  not part of the State of Hawaii, Midway Islands were a separate Country for amateur radio purposes.During this era there were two main amateur radio stations  KM6BI on Sand Island and KM6CE on Eastern Island. Many other amateurs operated under their own callsigns from their own quarters. They all provided a vital link back home via messages and phone patches. Here are QSL cards from the two main stations.

Missile Impact Location System
From 1958 through 1960 the United States installed the Missile Impact Location System (MILS) in the Navy managed Pacific Missile Range, later the Air Force managed Western Range, to localize the splash downs of test missile nose cones. MILS was developed and installed by the same entities that had completed the first phase of the Atlantic and U.S. West Coast SOSUS systems. A MILS installation, consisting of both a target array for precision location and a broad ocean area system for good positions outside the target area, was installed at Midway as part of the system supporting Intercontinental Ballistic Missile (ICBM) tests. Other Pacific MILS shore terminals were at the Marine Corps Air Station Kaneohe Bay supporting Intermediate Range Ballistic Missile (IRBM) tests with impact areas northeast of Hawaii and the other ICBM test support systems at Wake Island and Eniwetok.

Eastern Island

Eastern Island was home for the Naval Security Group Activity, Midway Island from 1 July 1954 until February 1971.  The activity operated a AN/GRD-6 High Frequency Direction Finder  that was part of both the Eastern and Western Pacific HFDF networks.

Naval Facility Midway

During the Cold War the U.S. established a shore terminal, in which output of the array at sea was processed and displayed by means of the Low Frequency Analyzer and Recorder (LOFAR), of the Sound Surveillance System (SOSUS), Naval Facility (NAVFAC) Midway Island, to track Soviet submarines. The facility became operational in 1968 and was commissioned January13, 1969. It remained secret until its decommissioning on September30, 1983, after data from its arrays had been remoted first to Naval Facility Barbers Point, Hawaii, in 1981 and then directly to the Naval Ocean Processing Facility (NOPF) Ford Island, Hawaii. U.S. Navy WV-2

Civilian handover

In 1978, the Navy downgraded Midway from a Naval Air Station to a Naval Air Facility and large numbers of personnel and dependents began leaving the island. With the war in Vietnam over, and with the introduction of reconnaissance satellites and nuclear submarines, Midway's significance to U.S. national security was diminished. The World War II facilities at Sand and Eastern Islands were listed on the National Register of Historic Places on May28, 1987, and were simultaneously added as a National Historic Landmark.

As part of the Base Realignment and Closure process, the Navy facility on Midway has been operationally closed since September10, 1993, although the Navy assumed responsibility for cleaning up environmental contamination.

2011 tsunami
The 2011 Tōhoku earthquake and tsunami on March 11 caused many deaths among the bird population on Midway. Scientists on the island, however, do not think it will have long-term negative impacts on the bird populations.

A U.S. Geological Survey study found that the Midway Atoll, Laysan, and Pacific islands like them could become inundated and unfit to live on during the 21st century, due to increased storm waves and rising sea levels.

National Wildlife Refuge and National Monument

Midway was designated an overlay National Wildlife Refuge on April22, 1988, while still under the primary jurisdiction of the Navy.

From August 1996, the general public could visit the atoll through study ecotours. This program ended in 2002, but another visitor program was approved and began operating in March 2008. This program operated through 2012, but was suspended for 2013 due to budget cuts.

On October 31, 1996, President Bill Clinton signed Executive Order 13022, which transferred the jurisdiction and control of the atoll to the United States Department of the Interior. The FWS assumed management of the Midway Atoll National Wildlife Refuge. The last contingent of Navy personnel left Midway on June30, 1997, after an ambitious environmental cleanup program was completed.

On September 13, 2000, Secretary of the Interior Bruce Babbitt designated the Wildlife Refuge as the Battle of Midway National Memorial. The refuge is now titled as the "Midway Atoll National Wildlife Refuge and Battle of Midway National Memorial".

On June 15, 2006, President George W. Bush designated the Northwestern Hawaiian Islands as a national monument. The Northwestern Hawaiian Islands Marine National Monument encompasses , and includes  of coral reef habitat. The Monument also includes the Hawaiian Islands National Wildlife Refuge and the Midway Atoll National Wildlife Refuge.

In 2007, the Monument's name was changed to Papahānaumokuākea Marine National Monument. The National Monument is managed by the U.S. Fish and Wildlife Service, the National Oceanic and Atmospheric Administration (NOAA), and the State of Hawaii. In 2016 President Obama expanded the Papahānaumokuākea Marine National Monument, and added the Office of Hawaiian Affairs as a fourth co-trustee of the monument.

Environment

Midway Atoll forms part of the Northwest Hawaiian Islands Important Bird Area (IBA), designated as such by BirdLife International because of its seabirds and endemic landbirds. The atoll is a critical habitat in the central Pacific Ocean, and includes breeding habitat for 17 seabird species. A number of native species rely on the island, which is now home to 67–70 percent of the world's Laysan albatross population, and 34–39 percent of the global population of black-footed albatross. A very small number of the very rare short-tailed albatross also have been observed. Fewer than 2,200 individuals of this species are believed to exist due to excessive feather hunting in the late nineteenth century. In 2007–08, the U.S. Fish and Wildlife Service translocated 42 endangered Laysan ducks to the atoll as part of their efforts to conserve the species.

The critically endangered Hawaiian monk seals raise their pups on the beaches, relying on the atoll's reef fish, squid, octopus and crustaceans. Green sea turtles, another threatened species, occasionally nest on the island. The first was found in 2006 on Spit Island and another in 2007 on Sand Island. A resident pod of 300 spinner dolphins live in the lagoons and nearshore waters.

The islands of Midway Atoll have been extensively altered as a result of human habitation. Starting in 1869 with the project to blast the reefs and create a port on Sand Island, the environment of Midway atoll has experienced profound changes.

A number of invasive exotics have been introduced; for example, ironwood trees from Australia were planted to act as windbreaks. Of the 200 species of plants on Midway, 75 percent are non-native. Recent efforts have focused on removing non-native plant species and re-planting native species.

Lead paint on the buildings posed an environmental hazard (avian lead poisoning) to the albatross population of the island. In 2018, a project to strip the paint was completed.

Pollution

Midway Atoll, in common with all the Hawaiian Islands, receives substantial amounts of marine debris from the Great Pacific Garbage Patch. Consisting of 90 percent plastic, this debris accumulates on the beaches of Midway. This garbage represents a hazard to the bird population of the island. Every year 20 tons of plastic debris washes up on Midway, with 5 tons of that debris being fed to Albatross chicks. The U.S. Fish and Wildlife Service estimates at least  of plastic washes up every week.

Of the 1.5 million Laysan Albatrosses that inhabit Midway, nearly all are found to have plastic in their digestive system. Approximately one-third of the chicks die. These deaths are attributed to the albatrosses confusing brightly colored plastic with marine animals (such as squid and fish) for food. Recent results suggest that oceanic plastic develops a chemical signature that is normally used by seabirds to locate food items.

Because albatross chicks do not develop the reflex to regurgitate until they are four months old, they cannot expel the plastic pieces. Albatrosses are not the only species to suffer from the plastic pollution; sea turtles and monk seals also consume the debris. A variety of plastic items wash upon the shores, from cigarette lighters to toothbrushes and toys. An albatross on Midway can have up to 50 percent of its intestinal tract filled with plastic.

Transportation
The usual method of reaching Sand Island, Midway Atoll's only populated island, is on chartered aircraft landing at Sand Island's Henderson Field, which also functions as an emergency diversion point runway for transpacific flights.

See also

Desert island
Lists of islands
List of national memorials of the United States

References

Further reading

Natural history
Hubert, Mabel, Carl Frings, and H. Franklin – Sounds of Midway: Calls of Albatrosses of Midway.
Mearns, Edgar Alexander – A List of the Birds Collected by Dr. Paul Bartsch in the Philippine Islands, Borneo, Guam, and Midway Island, with Descriptions of Three New Forms.

Military history

External links

U.S. Fish & Wildlife Service Midway Atoll National Wildlife Refuge and Battle of Midway National Memorial (this article incorporated some content from this public domain site)
Papahānaumokuākea Marine National Monument – Midway 
Diary from the middle of nowhere BBC's environment correspondent David Shukman reports on the threat of plastic rubbish drifting in the North Pacific Gyre to Midway. Accessed 2008-03-26.
The Battle of Midway: Turning the Tide in the Pacific, a National Park Service Teaching with Historic Places (TwHP) lesson plan
Marines at Midway: by Lieutenant Colonel R.D. Heinl, Jr., USMC Historical Section, Division of Public Information Headquarters, U.S. Marine Corps 1948,
Past residents of Midway Discussion of Midway related topics by former residents and those interested in Midway.
Midway Atoll Today (2010)
Island Conservation: Midway Atoll Restoration Project

Midway Atoll
Articles containing video clips
Atolls of Hawaii
Cenozoic Hawaii
Coral reefs of the United States
Hawaiian–Emperor seamount chain
Pacific islands claimed under the Guano Islands Act
IUCN Category IV
National Wildlife Refuges in the United States insular areas
Northwestern Hawaiian Islands
Oligocene volcanoes
Paleogene Oceania
Protected areas established in 1988
Reefs of the Pacific Ocean
Seabird colonies
United States Minor Outlying Islands
World War II sites
National Memorials of the United States
Island restoration
Important Bird Areas of United States Minor Outlying Islands
Important Bird Areas of Oceania